The Beautiful River is a river in the Buller district in the South island of New Zealand. It is a tributary of the Karamea River.

See also
List of rivers of New Zealand

References
Land Information New Zealand - Search for Place Names
 Topographic Map NZMS 260 sheet: M26

Buller District
Rivers of the West Coast, New Zealand
Rivers of New Zealand